OSN Sports (formerly known as ShowSports) was a Pan Arab satellite sports television network owned by Orbit Showtime Network. First launched in early April 2007, it operated eight HD channels: OSN Sports Action 1, OSN Sports Action 2, OSN Sports 3, OSN Sports 4, OSN Sports 5, OSN Sports Cricket, OSN WWE Network and OSN Fight Network.

On March 31, 2019, all OSN Sports channels were shut down. OSN continued to broadcast cricket on a new channel, OSN Cric. On July 15, 2019, OSN Cric was shut down.

Channels

OSN Sports Action 1 
Offers coverage of separate sports events.

OSN Sports Action 2 
Broadcasts WWE Raw, WWE SmackDown Live, Rugby World Cup, National Rugby League, Super League, Australian Football League and International Cricket.

OSN Sports 3 
Broadcasts live cricket matches, I-League, PKL, HIL notably The Ashes series, IPL, rugby and golf action through shows and highlights and reruns of WWE Smackdown.

OSN Sports 4 
Specialized in WWE as it airs WWE NXT, WWE Bottom Line and WWE Vintage Collection. It also features extreme sports such as UFC, Slamball, Monster Jam and Airsport World, in addition to Monster Garage.

OSN WWE Network 

On February 12, 2015, WWE announced a five-year partnership with OSN to bring the WWE Network to the Middle East and North Africa as a premium service.

OSN Fight Network

See also 
 Orbit Showtime Network
 OSN Movies
 OSN Yahala
 OSN News

References

External links 
 OSN Sports

Showtime Networks
Sports mass media in the Middle East
Defunct television networks
Television channels and stations established in 2007
Television channels and stations disestablished in 2019